Zeynep Tufekci is a Turkish-American sociologist.  A professor at Columbia University, she also writes as a columnist for The New York Times. Her work focuses on social media, media ethics, the social implications of new technologies, such as artificial intelligence and big data, as well as societal challenges such as the COVID-19 pandemic using complex and systems-based thinking. According to The Chronicle of Higher Education, she is one of the most prominent academic voices on social media and the new public sphere. In 2022, Tufekci was a Pulitzer Prize finalist for her “insightful, often prescient, columns on the pandemic and American culture”, which the committee said “brought clarity to the shifting official guidance and compelled us towards greater compassion and informed response.”

Before becoming a regular columnist, she occasionally wrote for The New York Times and The Atlantic and  wrote columns for Wired and Scientific American. She is a professor at Columbia University's Craig Newmark Center for Journalism Ethics and Security and a faculty associate at the Berkman Klein Center for Internet and Society at Harvard University. She was previously an associate professor at the School of Information and Library Science at the University of North Carolina.

Early life and education
Tufekci was born in Istanbul, Turkey, near Taksim Gezi Park in Istanbul's Beyoğlu district.

In 1995, Tufekci received a B.A. in sociology from Istanbul University, as well as an undergraduate degree in computer programming from Boğaziçi University.

Career

Tufekci worked as a computer programmer before becoming an academic and turning her attention to social science.

In 2012, Tufekci became a faculty associate at the Berkman Klein Center for Internet & Society research facility at Harvard University.

In 2012, Tufekci expressed concern about political campaigns impacted by and driven by big data in the form of "Smart Campaigns". This early warning was eventually recognized as prescient after Donald Trump was elected in 2016. Tufekci's research and publications include topics such as the effect of big data on politics and the public sphere, how social media affects social movements, and the privacy and security vulnerabilities exposed by the coming Internet of Things. In general, she has sought to outline the potential negative societal consequences of social media and big data, while not rejecting these phenomena outright. Tufekci's work has often emphasized examining business models of these technologies. She often speaks about their use of engagement algorithms.

Also from 2012, Tufekci has focused on explaining social contagion and mass shootings and its direct relation to social media. She has repeatedly urged both online and in op-eds that outlets should avoid repetition of the killer's name and face as well as step-by-step discussions of their methods. The phenomenon of suicide contagion via social media and news coverage is part of Tufekci's analytical work.
  
Tufekci has written on pandemic planning and social responses. In 2014 she wrote on Ebola and pandemic preparedness.

In 2016, Tufekci was featured in a special report by The Economist on technology and politics in which she argues that the increasingly individualized targeting of voters by political campaigns is leading to a reduction of the "public sphere" in which civic debate takes place publicly.

In May 2017, Tufekci's first book, Twitter and Tear Gas: The Power and Fragility of Networked Protest, was published by Yale University Press.

In the fall of 2017, Tufekci delivered a talk entitled "Democracy vs. Clickbait" at Dartmouth's Neukom Institute's Donoho Colloquium, where she said she had discovered in FCC filings that Facebook is only making about $10 to $20 USD per year per person. "Charge me that," she suggested, "and make me the customer."

In January 2018, Tufekci wrote a story for Wired titled "It's the (Democracy-Poisoning) Golden Age of Free Speech," writing that the current internet landscape "invalidates much of what we think about free speech—conceptually, legally, and ethically" She was a regular contributor at Wired.

In March 2018, Tufekci wrote in The New York Times that "YouTube may be one of the most powerful radicalizing instruments of the 21st century." She cited the rise of conspiracy videos during the Trump administration and especially after the shooting at Marjory Stoneman Douglas High School in Parkland, Florida.

In 2018, Tufekci was interviewed as part of the PBS series, Frontline, on issues of disinformation and Russian interference with Ukraine on Facebook.

In May 2019, Tufekci wrote an article for Scientific American on sociological versus psychological storytelling about season 8 of Game of Thrones titled "The Real Reason Fans Hate the Last Season of Game of Thrones".

In May 2019, Tufekci was featured as a speaker at the Craig Newmark Center for Journalism Ethics and Security Symposium at the Columbia Journalism School on the subject of "Reporting from the Front Lines of the Information Wars".

In 2020 during the COVID-19 pandemic, Tufekci wrote numerous articles explaining the importance of flattening the curve, the importance of mask wearing, and academic articles covering the evidence for mask wearing. Tufekci was critical of the mainstream media for failing to explain the importance of mask wearing, and is often cited as one of the first to take up the importance of mask wearing in the mainstream media. This led to Tufekci becoming one of the academics who advised the WHO on adopting a mask recommendation. In March 2023, Tufekci criticized the findings and authors of a Cochrane systematic review that she argued did not accurately communicate the totality of evidence for mask wearing. Tufekci has also written articles advocating for the importance of outdoor spaces, encouraging beaches and parks to stay open during the COVID-19 pandemic, calling for clearer ventilation guidelines to mitigate the airborne transmission of COVID-19, and also about advocating for a single-dose and/or delayed booster trial for the mRNA COVID-19 vaccines.

In addition to her mainstream media writing during the COVID-19 pandemic, Tufekci has co-authored articles published in peer reviewed academic journals reviewing evidence that the SARS-CoV-2 virus is airborne. Her academic co-authors are interdisciplinary, and have included British medical professor, Trisha Greenhalgh, and environmental engineering professor, Linsey Marr. In an April 2021 "Head to Head" News and Views article in the British Medical Journal, accompanying a review, "Covid-19: What do we know about airborne transmission of SARS-CoV-2?", Tufekci and her co-authors argued against outdoor mask policy, and addressed how access to safer, ventilated, outdoor space is an equity issue.

Also in 2020, Tufekci was interviewed as part of the WNYC-FM radio series On the Media. She criticized the mainstream media's over-reliance on opinion polling and psephology in advance of the 2020 United States elections, arguing flawed polling helped sway the public into voting for more harmful candidates, which forecast models did not take into account. She urged for more limited use of both. Tufekci was also interviewed on the BBC, WGBH, and Public Radio Exchange co-production The World. She stated that President Trump's refusal to concede the election to Joe Biden, along with his false claims of fraud sent signals, accelerated by social media and compounded by gerrymandering, that undermined the nation's democratic character in favor of bolstering authoritarianism and right-wing populism, and accelerating the democratic recession worldwide.

Tufekci has given a series of TED talks on online social change, technology, the role of artificial intelligence and machine learning, and the role of social media and tech companies.

Honors and awards
 2005: International Communication Association, Top Eight Papers in Communication and Technology for "Digital Divide and Social Mobility: How Much Hope and How Much Hype?"
 2011-2012: The Berkman Klein Center for Internet & Society at Harvard University, Fellow
 2012-2013: Princeton University, Center for Information Technology Policy, Fellow
 2014: Business Insider, The 100 Most Influential Tech People On Twitter
 2014: American Sociological Association, The Section on Communication, Information Technologies, and Media Sociology's Award for Public Sociology
 2015-2016: Carnegie Corporation of New York, Andrew Carnegie Fellow in the Social Sciences and Humanities
 2022: Honorary Doctor of Humane Letters degree, Brown University

Works

Books

Essays and reporting

Theses

TED talks
 Tufekci, Zeynep (October 2014)  
 Tufekci, Zeynep (June 2016) 
 Tufekci, Zeynep (September 2017)

Critical studies and reviews of Tufekci's work
Twitter and tear gas

References

External links

 
 Zeynep Tufekci at UNC School of Information and Library Science
 Zeynep Tufekci at The Berkman Klein Center for Internet & Society at Harvard University
 
 Zeynep Tufekci at Scientific American
 Zeynep Tufekci at The Atlantic
 Zeynep Tufekci at The New York Times
 Zeynep Tufekci at WIRED
 

21st-century American non-fiction writers
21st-century American women writers
American magazine writers
American political writers
American social sciences writers
American sociologists
American women sociologists
American technology writers
American women non-fiction writers
American women social scientists
The Atlantic (magazine) people
Computer science writers
Living people
The New York Times writers
People from Beyoğlu
Academics from Istanbul
Turkish sociologists
University of North Carolina at Chapel Hill faculty
Turkish emigrants to the United States
Writers from Istanbul
Women technology writers
Year of birth missing (living people)
American women journalists
University of Maryland, Baltimore faculty
Berkman Fellows
Istanbul University alumni
Boğaziçi University alumni
University of Texas at Austin alumni